The Semovente da 75/34 was an Italian self-propelled gun developed and used during World War II. It was a 75 mm L/34 gun mounted on a M15/42 tank chassis. It saw action during the defence of Rome in 1943 and later served with the Germans in Northern Italy and the Balkans. 141 were produced during the war (60 before the Armistice of Cassibile in September 1943, 81 later under  German control).

Development 
After the success of the Semovente da 75/18, it was decided to build a vehicle with a better gun, to improve its anti-tank capability (which on the former was given by the use of HEAT shells); some prototypes were built which replaced the Obice da 75/18 with a 75 mm L/32 field gun on the M14/41 tank chassis. Production began in spring 1943, with the 75 mm L/34 gun (the same as on the Carro Armato P 40) on the chassis of the M15/42 tank. Some sixty were built before the Italian armistice in September 1943.

Design 

Service
The only operational use by the Regio Esercito was in the unsuccessful defence of Rome from 8–10 September 1943. After the Armistice of Cassibile, Italy switched sides in the war and their former ally, Germany, became their enemy. Some twelve Semoventi da 75/34 were assigned to the CXXXV Gruppo  of the 135a Divisione Corazzata Ariete II. Only a few were destroyed in the fighting and the rest were seized by the Germans, which employed them in Italy and the Balkans; under German direction, some eighty more were built until 1945.

See also

Comparable vehicles
 Germany – StuG III, StuG IV and Jagdpanzer IV
 Romania – Mareșal
 Soviet Union – SU-85
 United Kingdom – SP 17pdr, A30 (Avenger)
 United States – M10 GMC

References

External links
 Semovente da 75/34 at wwiivehicles.com
 Semovente da 75/34 at onwar.com
 Semovente Da 75/34 at tanks-encyclopedia.com

Armoured fighting vehicles of Italy
World War II armoured fighting vehicles of Italy
World War II self-propelled artillery
75 mm artillery
Gio. Ansaldo & C. armored vehicles
Military vehicles introduced from 1940 to 1944